Vervò (Vervòu in local dialect) was a comune (municipality) in Trentino in the northern Italian region Trentino-Alto Adige/Südtirol, located about  north of Trento. It was merged with Coredo, Smarano, Taio and Tres on January 1, 2015, to form a new municipality, Predaia.

Vervò borders the following municipalities: Taio, Kurtatsch an der Weinstraße, Tres, Ton and Roverè della Luna.

Demographic evolution

References

Cities and towns in Trentino-Alto Adige/Südtirol
Nonsberg Group